The March 832 was a British open-wheel Formula 2 racing car, built by March Engineering in 1983. The car's best result in Formula 2 racing was third in the 1983 championship season with Beppe Gabbiani scoring 4 wins with Onyx Racing. After finding moderate success in open-wheel racing, it was later decided to convert the car to a closed-wheel sports prototype, for the revived Can-Am series, and compete in 1984. It was powered by the 2-liter BMW M12/7B engine. Kim Campbell successfully won the 2-liter Can-Am Championship that season, not scoring any wins, but managing to score 4 podiums, which was enough to clinch the championship.

References

Formula Two cars
Sports prototypes
Can-Am cars
March vehicles